Yuri Vasilyevich Golov (22 July 1937 – 9 January 2014) was a Russian footballer who primarily played as a forward.

Golov played in the Soviet Top League and Soviet First League with FC Volga Gorky. He also played in the Soviet First League with FC Avangard Zhovti Vody and FC Metallurg Kuibyshev.

Biography 
Yuri Golov debuted as a professional footballer in 1961 at the age of 25 with the club Raketa Gorky. Three years later, at Volga Gorky, in his first match against FC Dinamo Moscow, he scored the winning goal, at the Dynamo Stadium, against Lev Yashin. He is also the ninth player with the most goals in the club's history, with 26. After four seasons and 156 games played, he was transferred to FC Avanhard for one season. Finally, Yuri Golov retired in 1972 at the age of 36.

Yuri Golov died following a long illness on 9 January 2014, aged 77, in his hometown of Nizhny Novgorod, Russia.

Clubs

References

1937 births
2014 deaths
Sportspeople from Nizhny Novgorod
Russian footballers
Association football forwards
FC Volga Nizhny Novgorod players